The 2021–22 Azerbaijan Cup was the 30th season of the annual cup competition in Azerbaijan, with Premier League side Keşla being the defending champions from the 2020–21.

Teams

First round

Quarterfinals

Semi–finals

Final

Scorers

4 goals:

 Ibrahima Wadji - Qarabağ
 Ramil Sheydayev - Qarabağ

3 goals:

 Joy-Lance Mickels - Sabah
 Kady - Qarabağ

2 goals:

 Isnik Alimi - Gabala
 Ramon - Neftçi
 Mirsahib Abbasov - Sabail
 Loris Brogno - Zira
 Hamidou Keyta - Zira

1 goals:

 Ulvi Isgandarov - Gabala
 Asif Mammadov - Gabala
 Rovlan Muradov - Gabala
 Samir Abdullayev - Keşla
 Rahman Hajiyev - Keşla
 İlham Allahverdiyev - MOIK Baku
 Emin Mahmudov - Neftçi
 Vojislav Stanković - Neftçi
 Musa Gurbanlı - Qarabağ
 Ismayil Ibrahimli - Qarabağ
 Leandro Andrade - Qarabağ
 Patrick Andrade - Qarabağ
 Abdellah Zoubir - Qarabağ
 Elnur Samadov - Qaradağ Lökbatan
 Kamran Quliyev - Sabah
 Juan Cámara - Sabah
 Ruslan Hajiyev - Sabail
 Afran Ismayilov - Sabail
 Araz Abdullayev - Sumgayit
 Roini İsmayilov - Zagatala
 Coşqun Diniyev - Zira
 Tamkin Khalilzade - Zira
 Aghabala Ramazanov - Zira
 Mo Hamdaoui - Zira

See also
 2021–22 Azerbaijan Premier League
 2021–22 Azerbaijan First Division

References

Azerbaijan Cup seasons
Azerbaijan
Cup